Hasanali may refer to:

Hasanali Kandi
Deh-e Hasanali, Lorestan